Labuan War Cemetery is a Commonwealth World War II graveyard in Labuan, Malaysia.

The cemetery
Many of the personnel buried in this cemetery, including Indian and Australian troops, were killed during the Japanese invasion of Borneo or the Borneo campaign of 1945. Others were prisoners of war in the region, including a number of those who perished on the infamous Sandakan Death Marches, and many hundreds of Allied POWs (mostly British and Australian) who died during their imprisonment by the Japanese at Batu Lintang camp near Kuching were also reburied here.

This graveyard was erected by Commonwealth War Graves Commission. Among those buried are Jack Mackey (1922–1945) and Tom Derrick (1914–1945), each of whom received the Victoria Cross.

Gallery

See also 
 Cheras War Cemetery, Kuala Lumpur
 Taiping War Cemetery, Taiping
 Kranji War Cemetery, Singapore
 Terendak Garrison Cemetery, Malacca

References

External links

 
 

Buildings and structures in Labuan
Cemeteries in Malaysia
Commonwealth War Graves Commission cemeteries in Malaysia
World War II cemeteries
Tourist attractions in Labuan